The Heilbronn Institute for Mathematical Research is an international research institute for mathematics based at the University of Bristol. It is named after the distinguished number theorist Hans Heilbronn who worked at Bristol University from 1934–1935 and 1946–1964. The Institute was founded in 2005 and is run as a partnership between the UK Government Communications Headquarters and the UK academic mathematics community.  It has facilities in Bristol, London, and Manchester. The current Chair of the Institute is Geoffrey Grimmett FRS.

The Institute has headquarters in the Fry Building of Bristol University, to which it moved in September 2019 together with the School of Mathematics of the University.

References

External links 
 Institute website

Research institutes established in 2005
Mathematical institutes
Research institutes in Bristol